The term "self-exclusion" or "voluntary exclusion" usually refers to a policy enacted by some governments and/or individual casinos as a way of addressing the issue of problem gambling.

In areas that have enacted self-exclusion policies, an individual who is aware that they suffer from a gambling problem can voluntarily request that their name be added to the self-exclusion list. If their application is accepted, the person in question becomes legally banned from all participating casinos within the self-exclusion coverage area. If a person who has been added to the self-exclusion list enters or attempts to enter a casino that participates in the self-exclusion program, they can be arrested and charged with trespassing. In addition, any chips, tokens, credits or other winnings in their possession at the time of arrest can be confiscated or invalidated.

The participant must complete the form voluntarily.

Self-exclusion programs are available in the US, the UK, Canada, Australia, South Africa, and other countries.

Effectiveness 

Gambling self-exclusion programs seem to help some (but not all) problem gamblers to gamble less often.

Some experts maintain that casinos in general arrange for self-exclusion programs as a public relations measure without actually helping many of those with gambling problems. A campaign of this type merely "deflects attention away from problematic products and industries," according to Natasha Dow Schull, a cultural anthropologist at New York University and author of the book Addiction by Design who was interviewed for The Fifth Estate in Canada. Other experts believe that self-enforcement is part of the problem gambling addict's own responsibility, as one aspect of any therapy program. "Without such acceptance of responsibility, much of the effectiveness of self-exclusion programs would be lost", as one explained.

There is also a question as to the effectiveness of such programs, which can be difficult to enforce. In the province of Ontario, Canada, for example, the Self-Exclusion program operated by the government's Ontario Lottery and Gaming Corporation (OLG) is not effective, according to investigation conducted by the television series, revealed in late 2017.  "Gambling addicts ... said that while on the ... self-exclusion list, they entered OLG properties on a regular basis" in spite of the facial recognition technology in place at the casinos, according to the Canadian Broadcasting Corporation. A CBC journalist who tested the system found that he was able to enter Ontario casinos and gamble on four distinct occasions, in spite of having been registered and photographed for the self-exclusion program. Reminding viewers that the problem gambler must accept some responsibility after requesting self-enforcement, an OLG spokesman provided this response when questioned by the CBC: "We provide supports to self-excluders by training our staff, by providing disincentives, by providing facial recognition, by providing our security officers to look for players. No one element is going to be foolproof because it is not designed to be foolproof". As OLG literature confirms, the enforcement by a casino cannot be expected to be 100% foolproof. "If you attempt to re-enter a gaming facility in Ontario,
your image may be captured by cameras and you may be automatically detected by security." A 2019 UK investigation showed the limits of self-exclusion schemes, when it was reported that players could circumvent exclusion by simply changing their email address, or by changing a letter in their names. The UKGC suggest a multi-layered solution to the problem.

Liquor self-exclusion 
The term "self-exclusion" usually refers to voluntary exclusion from gambling venues. Yet many businesses which sell or serve alcohol also allow patrons to make informal requests for self-exclusion. In some places, standardized liquor self-exclusion request forms are available online, and businesses are legally required to honor valid self-exclusion requests.

See also 
 Gamblers Anonymous

References

External links 
 VEP Frequently Asked Questions for Missouri (gambling self-exclusion policies are widely similar in other states and locales).

Gambling and society